Justin Quincy Hubner (born 14 September 2003 's-Hertogenbosch, Netherlands) is a professional footballer who plays as a defender for Premier League club Wolverhampton Wanderers.

Early life
Born in 's-Hertogenbosch, he played in the youth sides of Willem II and Brabant United as well as for his hometown club FC Den Bosch.

Club career

As a youth player, Hubner joined the youth academy of Dutch second tier side FC Den Bosch.

In February 2020 Hubner joined Wolverhampton Wanderers from FC Den Bosch, with his new club describing him as a left sided centre back who would go into their academy squad.

International career
In October 2022 Hubner was linked to a call up to Indonesian national football teams. Indonesia manager Shin Tae-yong pointed to the selection of Rafael Struick, Ivar Jenner, and Hubner as foreign based players ahead of the 2023 AFC Asian Cup and Indonesia hosting the 2023 FIFA U-20 World Cup.

Hubner joined the Indonesia squad for a training camp in Turkey in November 2022. He was quoted as saying “"I am currently in Turkey to join the Indonesian national team. I am very happy to have the opportunity to play with my friends. I hope to make Indonesia proud“. On 17 November 2022, he played for the Indonesia U-20 against France U-20 in a friendly match in Spain. He also played against Slovakia U-20 two days later.

Prior to his naturalisation by Indonesia he had represented the Netherlands U-19 football team.

Career statistics

Club

Personal life
Hubner’s mother is Dutch whilst his father is Indonesian, with family in Jakarta and Makassar, and his grandmother being from Bandung.

References

2003 births
Living people
People from 's-Hertogenbosch
Indonesian footballers
Indonesia youth international footballers
Dutch footballers
Netherlands youth international footballers
Dutch people of Indonesian descent
Indonesian people of Dutch descent
Association football defenders